Pavetteae is a tribe of flowering plants in the family Rubiaceae and contains about 624 species in 9 genera. Its representatives are found from the tropics and subtropics of the Old World and the southern Pacific region.

Genera 
Currently accepted names

 Cladoceras Bremek. (1 sp)
 Coptosperma Hook.f. (21 sp)
 Leptactina Hook.f. (19 sp)
 Nichallea Bridson (1 sp)
 Paracephaelis Baill. (4 sp)
 Pavetta L. (358 sp)
 Robbrechtia De Block (2 sp)
 Rutidea DC. (21 sp)
 Tarenna Gaertn. (191 sp)

Synonyms

 Acmostigma Raf. = Pavetta
 Baconia DC. = Pavetta
 Bonatia Schltr. & K.Krause = Tarenna
 Camptophytum Pierre ex A.Chev. = Tarenna
 Canthiopsis Seem. = Tarenna
 Chomelia L. = Tarenna
 Coleactina N.Hallé = Leptactina
 Crinita Houtt. = Pavetta
 Cupi Adans. = Tarenna
 Dictyandra Welw. ex Hook.f. = Leptactina
 Enterospermum Hiern = Coptosperma
 Exechostylus K.Schum. = Pavetta
 Flemingia W.Hunter = Tarenna
 Pavate Adans. = Pavetta
 Santalina Hiern = Coptosperma
 Verulamia DC. ex Poir. = Pavetta
 Wahlenbergia Blume = Tarenna
 Webera Schreb. = Tarenna
 Zygoon Hiern = Coptosperma

References 

 
Ixoroideae tribes